Nigrescence is a word with a Latin origin. It describes a process of becoming black or developing a racial identity.

Nigrescence extends through history and impacts those victimized by racism and white supremacy. Recent psychological adaptations instigated identity formation for persons of African American descent. The process of enslavement typically included deliberate and forceful repression of traditional languages and mental development to stifle the desire for freedom and to make freedom feel unattainable and unrealistic. Slave owners knew that physical restraints were never as effective as broken spirits. Hundreds of years later, the descendants of African diaspora struggle to process any form of trauma, which typically results in delayed progress in emotional development.

Professor William E. Cross Jr. included a theory of Nigrescence in his groundbreaking book Shades of Black: Diversity in African American Identity, which was published in 1991. His theory assumed that African Americans are "believed to be socialized into the predominant culture, which resulted in diminished racial identification", and thus the Nigrescence model posits that an encounter with an instance of racism or racial discrimination may precipitate the exploration and formation of racial identity, and foster a deeper understanding of the role race plays in the lives of African Americans. African Americans then proceed through a series of distinct psychological stages as they move from self-degradation to self-pride over time.

Charles Thomas came up with the concept of negromachy. He believed there was a confusion of self-worth where the person shows inappropriate dependence on white society for self definition. He created a five-stage nigrescence model.

Bailey Jackson created a four-stage nigrescense model. This model is depicted in the 6th episode of the 2023 TV series Unprisoned.

Frantz Fanon coined the term, "to become black", which meant as a process of developing a black identity under conditions of oppression.

Theorists  
 Frantz Fanon 
 William E. Cross Jr. 
 Bailey Jackson
 Charles Thomas

Stages

Pre-encounter 
The pre-encounter stage is characterized by an idealization of the  dominant traditional white world view and the denigration of a black world  view. There are two forms of pre-encounter, active or passive. People in the  active pre-encounter stage  deliberately idealize whiteness and white  culture and form anti-black attitudes and behaviors. In the active variant of  the pre-encounter stage, the separation of personality identity from the group  identity is evidenced. On the other hand, people experiencing passive or  assimilating pre-encounter, tend to believe that personal effort will guarantee  “passage” into white culture, i.e., the realization of the American dream. Such  people are highly motivated to be accepted by the dominant group, and at the  same time they also accept the negative stereotypes of blacks and the positive  stereotypes of whites since their views are influenced and reinforced by the  dominant culture and institutions.

Encounter 
The encounter stage is characterized by a conscious awareness that the  white world view is no longer viable, and that one must find a new identity.  This awareness is usually aroused by an event(s) in the environment that  profoundly touches a black person's inner thinking, spurring them to  re-evaluate the relationship between blacks and whites. And the event(s) makes  it impossible for the person to deny the existence of such a contradictory  relationship. The struggle that follows the confrontation is composed of a  mixture of feelings such as confusion, hopelessness, anxiety, depression, and  anger. The person has to search their own self-identity in relation with  racial identity, and their ascribed racial status in the society.

Immersion 
During the immersion stage, the person  psychologically and physically withdraws into blackness and a black world;  black racial identity dominates individual self identity. But the person may  not know what it really means to be black so the person may use the stereotypes  of what they learned from the white culture to define black people and act  accordingly, for example, wearing "black" clothes, listening to "black" music,  and attempting to speak in "black" slang. The person may be angry at  themselves for not realizing the differences earlier, and also angry at other  blacks for not opening their eyes to "see" things clearly. In this stage, the  world view is either-or, a dichotomous thinking about black and white. This  most likely happens to black adolescents who can't find meaningful purposes for  themselves and who they really are in the existing education system; they may show  strong hostility and anger toward others.

Emersion 

According to Cross, the emersion state is an acceptance of the multitude of ways to be and enact Blackness post-immersion. The fervor of full immersion levels off. At this stage, a person might begin to re-develop relationships with family members and friends who were cast off as under-serving Blackness during the immersion stage. Also during this stage, a person might be better able to control their behavior and intense emotions when participating in dominant society.

Internalization 
During this stage, the dissonance between the old self and the new emerging self are resolved. At this stage a person might adapt a more nuanced definition of Blackness and reject simplistic either-or definitions. A person's values and cultural style are rooted in informed African heritage and history. The person is connected spiritually and psychologically to an African-descended community.

See also
Négritude
Rachel Doležal

References

Bibliography 
Cross, William E. Jr. "Nigrescence Theory: Historical and Explanitory Notes." Journal of Vocational Behavior, April 23, 1994.

Biological anthropology
Historical definitions of race
Skin pigmentation